Jean Giono (30 March 1895 – 8 October 1970) was a French author who wrote works of fiction mostly set in Manosque in the Provence region of France.

Novels, novellas, chronicles 

 Hill of Destiny (Fr. Colline) – Grasset, 1929; English translation Brentano's, 1930
 Lovers are Never Losers (Fr. Un de Baumugnes) – Grasset – 1929 
 Second Harvest (Fr. Regain) – Grasset – 1930 
 Naissance de l'Odyssée – Editions Kra – 1930
 To The Slaughterhouse (Fr. Le Grand Troupeau) – Gallimard – 1931
 Blue Boy (Fr. Jean le Bleu) – Grasset – 1932 
 Solitude of Compassion (Fr. Solitude de la pitié) – Gallimard 1932 
 The Song of the World (Fr. Le Chant du monde – Gallimard – 1934 
 Joy of Man's Desiring (Fr. Que ma joie demeure) – Grasset – 1936
 Batailles dans la montagne – Gallimard – 1937
 The Serpent of Stars (Fr. Le serpent d'étoiles) – Grasset – 1939
 Pour saluer Melville – Gallimard – 1941
 L'eau vive – Gallimard – 1943 (Rondeur des Jours et l'Oiseau bagué -1973)
 A King Alone (Fr. Un roi sans divertissement) – Gallimard – 1947
 Noé – Editions la Table ronde – 1947
 Fragments d'un paradis – Déchalotte – 1948
 Mort d'un personnage – Grasset – 1949
 Les Âmes fortes – Gallimard – 1949 
 Les Grands chemins – Gallimard – 1951
 The Horseman on the Roof (Fr. Le Hussard sur le toit) – Gallimard – 1951
 The Malediction, (Fr. Le Moulin de Pologne) – 1952
 The Man Who Planted Trees (Fr. L'homme qui plantait des arbres) – Reader's Digest – 1953
 The Straw Man (Fr. Le Bonheur fou) – Éditions Gallimard – 1957
 Angelo (Fr. Angelo) – Gallimard – 1958
 Hortense ou l'Eau vive (avec Jean Allioux) Editions France-Empire – 1958
 Two Riders of the Storm (Fr. Deux cavaliers de l'orage) – Gallimard – 1965
 Le Déserteur – René Creux Editeur – 1966 (le Déserteur et autres récits – Gallimard – 1973)
 Ennemonde: A Novel (Fr. Ennemonde et Autres Caractères) – Gallimard – 1968
 L'Iris de Suse – Gallimard – 1970
 Les Récits de la demi-brigade – Gallimard – 1972
 Faust au village – Gallimard – 1977
 Le Bestiaire – Ramsay – 1991
 "Gavino" – Gallimard – 2000

Unfinished novels 

 Angélique – Gallimard – 1980
 Cœur, Passions, Caractères – Gallimard – 1982
 Dragoon suivi d'Olympe – Gallimard – 1982

Essays and journalism 

 Présentation de Pan – Éditions Grasset – 1930
 Manosque-des-plateaux – Emile-Paul Frères – 1931
 Le Serpent d'Etoiles – Grasset – 1933
 Les Vraies Richesses – Grasset – 1936
 Refus d'obéissance – Gallimard 1937
 Le Poids du ciel – Gallimard – 1938
 Lettre aux paysans sur la pauvreté et la paix – Grasset – 1938
 Précisions – Grasset – 1939
 Recherche de la pureté – Gallimard – 1939
 Triomphe de la vie – Ides et Calendes – 1941
 Trip to Italy ( Fr. Voyage en Italie) – Gallimard – 1953
 Notes sur l'affaire Dominici – Gallimard – 1955
 The Battle of Pavia (Fr. Le Désastre de Pavie) – Gallimard – 1963
 Les Terrasses de l'Ile d'''Elbe – Gallimard – 1976
 Les Trois Arbres de Palzem – Gallimard – 1984
 De Homère à Machiavel – Gallimard – 1986
 Images d'un jour de pluie et autres récits de jeunesse – Editions Philippe Auzou – 1987
 La Chasse au Bonheur – Gallimard – 1988
 Provence – Gallimard – 1993
 Les Héraclides – Quatuor – 1995
 De Montluc à la "Série Noire" – Gallimard – 1998

 Poetry 

 Accompagnés de la flûte – les Cahiers de l'Artisan – 1923
 La Chute des Anges, Fragment d'un Déluge, Le Cœur-Cerf – Rico – 1969

 Theater 

 Le bout de la Route – Lanceur de Graines – La Femme du boulanger – Gallimard – 1943
 Le Voyage en calèche – Éditions du Rocher – 1947. Written during the Second World War, this play was banned under the German occupation of France.
 Domitien, suivi de Joseph à Dothan – Gallimard – 1959
 Le Cheval fou – Gallimard – 1974

 Letters 

 Avec Jean Paulhan – Gallimard – 2000
 Avec André Gide – Université de Lyon – 1983
 Avec Jean Guéhenno – Seghers – 1975
 Avec Lucien Jacques – Gallimard – 1981 et 1983 (2 volumes)

 Journals 
 Journal de l'Occupation – Gallimard, 1995 (translated into English by Jody Gladding, Archipelago, 2020)
 Interviews 

 Avec Jean Carrière – La Manufacture – 1985
 Avec Jean et Taos Amrouche – Gallimard – 1990

 Translations 

 Moby Dick (translation of the Herman Melville novel; with Lucien Jacques and Joan Smith) – Les Cahiers du Contadour – 1939
 L'expédition d'Humphry Clinker (translation of the Tobias G. Smollett novel; with Catherine d'Ivernois) – Gallimard – 1955

Scenario

 Crésus'' – Rico – 1961

References 

Bibliographies of French writers
Bibliography